Alejandro Herrera may refer to:

 Alejandro Herrera (Heroes)
 Alejandro Herrera (athlete) (born 1958), Cuban athlete